Bruce Peninsula District School is a school in the community of Lion's Head in the municipality of Northern Bruce Peninsula, Bruce County, Ontario, Canada.

See also
List of high schools in Ontario

References

Elementary schools in Ontario
High schools in Ontario
Schools in Bruce County
Educational institutions in Canada with year of establishment missing